Michael Joseph Rossbach (12 February 1842, Heidingsfeld – 8 October 1894, Munich) was a German clinician and pharmacologist.

He studied medicine at the universities of Würzburg, Munich, Berlin and Prague, receiving his doctorate in 1865. In 1869 he qualified as a lecturer in pharmacology at Würzburg, where in 1874 he became an associate professor. In 1882 became a full professor of special pathology and therapy and director of the medical clinic at the University of Jena as a successor to Hermann Nothnagel. In 1892 he resigned his professorship at Jena for reasons of health.

His name is associated with "Rossbach's disease", a gastric disorder better known as hyperchlorhydria.

Selected works 
With Nothnagel, he was co-author of "Handbuch der Arzneimittellehre" (from the 3rd edition onward); a textbook that was translated into English with the title "A treatise on materia medica : (including therapeutics and toxicology)". Other noteworthy written efforts by Rossbach are:
 Physiologie und Pathologie der menschlichen Stimme; auf Grundlage der neuesten akustischen Leistungen, 1869 – Physiology and pathology of the human voice; based on the latest acoustic achievements.
 Pharmakologische Untersuchungen, 2 volumes 1873-76 – Pharmacological studies.
 Lehrbuch der physikalischen Heilmethoden für Aerzte und Studirende, 1882 – Textbook of physical healing methods for physicians and students.
 Ueber den gegenwärtigen Stand der internen Therapie und den therapeutischen Unterricht an den deutschen Hochschulen, 1883 – On the current state of internal therapy and therapeutic education at German universities.

References 

1842 births
1894 deaths
Physicians from Würzburg
Academic staff of the University of Würzburg
Academic staff of the University of Jena
German pharmacologists
University of Würzburg alumni
Ludwig Maximilian University of Munich alumni
Humboldt University of Berlin alumni
Charles University alumni